Scott Sanders may refer to:

Scott Sanders (director) (born 1968), American screenwriter and director
Scott Sanders (novelist) (born 1945), American novelist and essayist
Scott Sanders (producer) (born 1957), American television producer and theatrical producer
Scott Sanders (baseball) (born 1969), former Major League Baseball right-handed pitcher
Scott Sanders (admiral), Deputy Commander, U.S. Second Fleet
Scott Sanders (attorney) (born 1966), American defense attorney